Collagen alpha-3(IV) chain is a protein that in humans is encoded by the COL4A3 gene.

Type IV collagen, the major structural component of basement membranes, is a multimeric protein composed of 3 alpha subunits; this gene encodes the alpha 3 subunit. These subunits are encoded by 6 different genes, alpha 1 through alpha 6, each of which can form a triple helix structure with 2 other subunits to form type IV collagen. In Goodpasture's syndrome, autoantibodies bind to the collagen molecules in the basement membranes of alveoli and glomeruli. The epitopes that elicit these autoantibodies are localized largely to the non-collagenous C-terminal domain of the protein. A specific kinase phosphorylates amino acids in this same C-terminal region and the expression of this kinase is upregulated during pathogenesis. There are multiple alternate transcripts that appear to be unique to this human alpha 3 gene and alternate splicing is restricted to the six exons that encode this C-terminal domain. This gene is also linked to an autosomal recessive form of Alport syndrome. The mutations contributing to this syndrome are also located within the exons that encode this C-terminal region. Like the other members of the type IV collagen gene family, this gene is organized in a head-to-head conformation with another type IV collagen gene so that each gene pair shares a common promoter. Some exons of this gene are interspersed with exons of an uncharacterized gene which is on the opposite strand.

Disease Database
LOVD Alport gene variant databases (COL4A3, COL4A4, COL4A5)

References

Further reading

Collagens